The 2014 United Kingdom local elections were held on 22 May 2014. Usually these elections are held on the first Thursday in May but were postponed to coincide with the 2014 European Parliament Elections. Direct elections were held for all 32 London boroughs, all 36 metropolitan boroughs, 74 district/borough councils, 19 unitary authorities and various mayoral posts in England and elections to the new councils in Northern Ireland.

All registered electors (British, Irish, Commonwealth and European Union citizens) who were aged 18 or over on the day of the election were entitled to vote in the local elections.

The BBC's projected national vote share (PNV) put Labour on 31%, the Conservatives on 29%, UKIP on 17%, and the Liberal Democrats on 13%. Rallings and Thrasher of Plymouth University's national equivalent vote share (NEV) estimated 31% for Labour, 30% for the Conservatives, 18% for UKIP, and 11% for the Liberal Democrats.

For the fourth year running, the Labour Party enjoyed the largest share of the vote in local elections, but its share of the vote was its smallest since 2010. UKIP, which topped the same day's European Parliament elections, finished third in vote share, claiming council seats from Labour, the Conservatives and Liberal Democrats.

Overview of results

UK-wide results

England results

The Respect Party lost both their remaining councillors.

English Councils - shift of control
This table depicts how the control of local councils shifted in this election.

The data along the diagonal represents no shift in control in that number of councils: for example, Chorley was among the solid colour no change 73 Labour controlled councils. The other cells represent the shifts of control: for example, Harrow was one of five councils of which Labour gained control from No Overall Control. The intensity of the colour in a table cell other than the diagonal reflects the relative number of losses in council control suffered by each party.

Last updated at 11:30:10 on 27 May 2014

Northern Ireland results

London boroughs

All seats in the 32 London Borough Councils were up for election.

Summary of results

Individual council results

Harrow's Council was elected in 2010 with a Labour majority but divisions within this majority in 2013 led to a coalition struck between the Conservatives and the Independent Labour Group (formed of eight ex-Labour councillors). Conservatives withdrew their support for Independent Labour on 16 September 2013 leading to a brief Conservative minority administration.

Metropolitan boroughs
One third of the seats in all 36 Metropolitan Boroughs were up for election (showing those elected and each party's total in the new council).

Unitary authorities

Two unitary authorities had all of their seats up for election following boundary changes.

One third of the council seats were up for election in 17 unitary authorities (elected and totals shown).

Non-metropolitan districts

Whole council
Two district councils had all of their seats up for election following boundary changes

Half of council
Seven district councils had half of their seats up for election (showing those elected and the new council)

Third of council
65 district councils had one third of their seats up for election

† Elected councillors will hold office for one year only as Purbeck District will adopt whole council elections from 2015.

Mayoral elections
There were five mayoral elections.

In Copeland, there was a referendum to establish a post of directly elected mayor, which passed.

Northern Ireland

These were the first elections to the 11 new 'super-councils' in Northern Ireland, following a reorganisation. These will operate in shadow form for one year, with the current 26 councils existing in parallel.

Sinn Féin (dark green) won more seats than any other party in (1) Belfast, (9) Mid-Ulster, (10) Derry & Strabane and (11) Fermanagh & Omagh. Sinn Féin and the SDLP elected more councillors (14 each) than did any other party in (5) Newry, Mourne & Down . The Democratic Unionist Party (dark orange) won more seats than any other party in each of the other six councils, and won as many as all the other parties combined in (4) Lisburn & Castlereagh.

Party composition of new councils

The party abbreviations in this table are explained in the total-vote table that follows it.

{| class="wikitable sortable" style="text-align:center"
|+ Seats won
!
!
!
! 
! 
! 
! 
! 
! 
! 
!
|-
!
!Council
!Totalseats
!SF
!SDLP
!Alliance
!UUP
!DUP
!TUV
!Ind
!|Others
|-
| 3 || style="text-align:left"| Antrim and Newtownabbey||40 || 3 || 4 || 4 || 12 || style="background:mistyrose"| 15 || 2 || ||
|-
| 6 || style="text-align:left"| Armagh, Banbridge & Craigavon ||41 || 8 || 6 || || 12 || style="background:mistyrose"| 13 || || 1 || style="background:; color:white"| 1 UKIP
|-
| 1 || style="text-align:left"| Belfast City ||60||style="background:#ddFFdd"| 19 || 7 || 8 || 7 || 13 || 1 || || 5 *
|-
| 8 || style="text-align:left"| Causeway Coast and Glens ||40 || 7 || 6 || 1 || 10 || style="background:mistyrose"| 11 || 3 || 1 || style="background:; color:yellow"|1 PUP
|-
| 10 || style="text-align:left"| Derry and Strabane||40  || style="background:#ddFFdd"|16 || 10 ||  || 2 || 8 ||  || 4 ||
|-
| 11 || style="text-align:left"| Fermanagh and Omagh ||40 ||style="background:#ddFFdd"| 17 || 8 ||  || 9 || 5 || || 1 ||
|-
| 4 || style="text-align:left"| Lisburn and Castlereagh ||40 ||  || 3 || 7 || 8 || style="background:pink"| 20 || 1 || ||style="background:; color:white"| 1 NI21
|-
| 7 || style="text-align:left"| Mid and East Antrim||40   || 3 || 1 || 3 || 9 || style="background:mistyrose"| 16 || 5 || 2 || style="background:; color:white"| 1 UKIP
|-
| 9 || style="text-align:left"| Mid-Ulster ||40 ||style="background:#ddFFdd"| 18 || 6 ||   || 7 || 8 ||  || 1 ||
|-
| 5 || style="text-align:left"| Newry, Mourne and Down ||41 ||style="background:honeydew"| 14 ||style="background:honeydew"| 14 || 2 || 3 || 4 ||   || 3 || style="background:; color:white"| 1 UKIP
|-
|2 || style="text-align:left"| North Down and Ards ||40   || || 1 || 7 || 9 || style="background:mistyrose"| 17 || 1 || 2 || style="background:; color:white"|3 Green(NI)
|-
! colspan="2"| Total ||462|| 105 || 66 || 32 || 88 || 130 || 13 || 15 || 13
|-
| 1 ||colspan="10"|* Belfast other: 3 Progressive Unionist, 1 Green Party Northern Ireland & 1 People Before Profit
|-
| colspan="11" align="right"|source:'|-
|}

Votes cast
These elections used the Single Transferable Vote method of proportional representation. Votes and percentages for each party reflect the first preference on each ballot.

Electoral administration
Eligibility to vote
All registered electors (British, Irish, Commonwealth and European Union citizens) who were aged 18 or over on the day of the election were entitled to vote in the local elections. Those who were temporarily away from their ordinary address (for example, away working, on holiday, in student accommodation or in hospital) were also entitled to vote in the local elections, although those who have moved abroad and registered as overseas electors cannot vote in the local elections. Those who were registered to vote at more than one address (such as a university student who has a term-time address and lives at home during holidays) were entitled to vote in the local elections at each'' address, as long as they were not in the same local government area.

Enacting legislation
These elections were held on 22 May 2014 as provided by 'The Local Elections (Ordinary Day of Elections in 2014) Order 2013' ( 2013/2277).

See also
Political make-up of local councils in the United Kingdom

Notes

References

 
2014 elections in the United Kingdom
Council elections in the United Kingdom